Estádio Arthur Marinho is a stadium in Corumbá, Brazil. It has a capacity of 15,000 spectators.  It is the home of Pantanal Futebol Clube.

References

Football venues in Mato Grosso do Sul
Sports venues in Mato Grosso do Sul